Summer of Fear is a 1996 American made-for-television psychological thriller film starring Gregory Harrison,  Glynnis O'Connor, Lee Garlington and Corin Nemec. It is directed by Mike Robe based on the novel Simon Says by Gloria Murphy and premiered on CBS on April 3, 1996.

Plot
Lucas Marshall (Gregory Harrison) is a corporate executive who has inherited a summer cottage from his deceased aunt and decides to bring his family there for a summer vacation. En route to the cottage, the Marshalls encounter two evil men who attack the family only to be rescued by Simon (Corin Nemec), a 19-year-old mysterious drifter. Lucas then makes the fatal mistake of welcoming Simon into his family home.

Soon, Simon begins to play psychological games with the family, and Lucas becomes concerned as the young man forces his way into the family by becoming a role model to their son Zack (David Gallagher). Although Simon seems like a good-natured person, Lucas has bad feelings about him and fears that Simon may harbor a dark secret.

Cast
Gregory Harrison as Lucas Marshall
Glynnis O'Connor as 'Cat' Marshall
Lee Garlington as Winnie
Corin Nemec as Simon
David Gallagher as Zack
Natalie Shaw as Haley
Tom Nowicki as Cooper
David Jaynes as Earl
Mike Pniewski as Warren

Production
Summer of Fear was shot entirely on location in Jacksonville, Florida from January 22 to February 14, 1996.

Home video release
Summer of Fear was released on DVD by Platinum Disc on March 8, 2007.

References

External links
 
 

1996 films
1996 television films
1990s psychological thriller films
American psychological thriller films
CBS network films
Sonar Entertainment films
Films with screenplays by John Gay (screenwriter)
Films scored by Mark Snow
Films directed by Mike Robe
1990s American films